USS Porter (DDG-78) is an  in the United States Navy. Porter is the fifth US Navy ship to be named after US Navy officers Commodore David Porter, and his son, Admiral David Dixon Porter. This ship is the 28th destroyer of her class. Porter was the 12th ship of this class to be built at Ingalls Shipbuilding in Pascagoula, Mississippi. She was laid down on 2 December 1996, launched and christened on 12 November 1997, and commissioned 20 March 1999, in Port Canaveral, Florida.

Service history

OEF/OIF
From January to July 2003, Porter engaged in combat and support operations of Operation Enduring Freedom, Operation Iraqi Freedom, and Joint Task Force (JTF) Cobra. Porter launched Tomahawk missiles during the Dora Farms and Shock and Awe stages of the Iraq War. Porter also worked with the Israeli Defense Force (IDF) off the coast of Israel while some Porter Sailors worked with the IDF from the Nevatim base in the Negev desert of Southern Israel.

Piracy
On 28 October 2007, Porter attacked and sank two pirate skiffs off Somalia after receiving a distress call from the tanker  which was under attack from pirates.

2009 upgrade
On 12 November 2009, the Missile Defense Agency announced that Porter would be upgraded during fiscal year 2013 to RIM-161 Standard Missile 3 (SM-3) capability in order to function as part of the Aegis Ballistic Missile Defense System. In 2016 the aft CIWS mount was replaced by a SeaRAM missile system.

Operation Nanook 2010
In August 2010, Porter and the United States Coast Guard buoy tender  participated in Operation Nanook 2010 in Baffin Bay and the Davis Straits.
This was the fourth annual Operation Nanook organized by the Canadian Government, but it was the first to host foreign vessels.

2012 collision

The collision ripped a  hole in the starboard side of the destroyer, forcing her to Jebel Ali, Dubai for repairs. No one on either ship was injured. Initially Naval Forces Central Command did not provide details about the collision, saying that it was under investigation. Porters captain, Commander Martin Arriola, was subsequently removed from command of the ship and replaced by Commander Dave Richardson. On 12 October 2012, Porter rejoined Carrier Strike Group 12 for its transit through the Suez Canal following temporary repairs to the ship costing $700,000. Later repairs were budgeted at a cost of nearly $50 million.

Naval Station Rota
On 30 April 2015, Porter arrived at Naval Station Rota, Spain. Naval Station Rota is Porters new permanent homeport. Porter joins three other US destroyers at Rota. These four ships are assigned to the United States Sixth Fleet, and will conduct ballistic missile defense patrols in the Mediterranean Sea in support of Commander, US Sixth Fleet's mission.

2016 upgrade
In 2016, four destroyers patrolling with the U.S. 6th Fleet based in Naval Station Rota, Spain, including Porter received self-protection upgrades, replacing the aft Phalanx CIWS 20mm Vulcan cannon with the SeaRAM 11-cell RIM-116 Rolling Airframe Missile launcher. The SeaRam uses the same sensor dome as the Phalanx. This was the first time the close-range ship defense system was paired with an Aegis ship. All four ships to receive the upgrade were either Flight I or II, meaning they originally had two Phalanx CIWS systems when launched.

Attack on Shayrat Airfield

The missile strike was in response to the Khan Shaykhun chemical attack on 4 April 2017, which the U.S. government said was launched by the Syrian regime from Shayrat.

Defender Europe 2021
On 21 February 2021, Porter conducted an exercise with the Greek Navy's  with four F-16s off southern Crete.

2022 Baltic exercise

Homeport Shift to Norfolk
On 28 September 2022, Porter departed Naval Station Rota for the last time as part of a homeport shift of the Rota-based destroyers. In October 2022, the Navy announced that Porter arrived at Norfolk after 7 years serving as a Forward-Deployed Naval Forces-Europe (FDNF-E) destroyer.  replaced Porter at Rota.

Awards
 Captain Edward F. Ney Memorial Award for outstanding food service - (2020)

Coat of arms

Shield 
The shield has a quartered background of gold and a blue with a star in each upper quadrant. In the center of the shield is a red array enclosing a torch.

The traditional Navy colors were chosen for the shield because dark blue and gold represents the sea and excellence respectively. Red is emblematic of courage and sacrifice. The shield's quartered division recalling previous Porters while underlining the US Navy's worldwide mission and the four cardinal compass points. The stars represent each battle star earned by the fourth Porter during World War II and the Korean War. The AEGIS array is red to reflect courage and action and symbolizes her modern warfare capabilities. The Statue of Liberty torch represents the ship's motto and signifies freedom, the principle of which our country was founded.

Crest 
The crest consists of crossed swords behind an arm held trident, all surrounded by laurels.

Two Naval Officers' crossed swords honor David Porter, his son, and the ships mission to "Train, Fight and Win." The laurel, arm and trident are adaptations of the US Naval Academy's coat of arms highlighting David Porter's tenure as the Academy Superintendent. The trident is the symbol of sea power which denotes the AEGIS vertical launch system. The three prongs of the trident represent the three wars the Porter served in; the War of 1812, the Mexican War, and the Civil War.

Motto 
The motto is written on a scroll of gold that has a blue reverse side.

The ships motto is "Freedom's Champion". The motto is a reference to the principles upon which the United States of America was founded and the honorable feats of Admiral Porter.

Seal 
The coat of arms in full color as in the blazon, upon a white background enclosed within a dark blue oval border edged on the outside with a gold rope and bearing the inscription "USS PORTER" at the top and "DDG 78" in the base all gold.

References

External links

 Official ship's site 
 

Arleigh Burke-class destroyers
Destroyers of the United States
Ships built in Pascagoula, Mississippi
1997 ships
Maritime incidents in 2012
Non-combat naval accidents